
Year 122 BC was a year of the pre-Julian Roman calendar. At the time it was known as the Year of the Consulship of Ahenobarbus and Fannius (or, less frequently, year 632 Ab urbe condita) and the First Year of Yuanshou. The denomination 122 BC for this year has been used since the early medieval period, when the Anno Domini calendar era became the prevalent method in Europe for naming years.

Events 
 By place 
 Roman Republic 
 Marcus Fulvius Flaccus and Gaius Gracchus become tribunes and propose a number of radical reforms in Rome.
 Gracchus passes a law requiring the state to provide weapons and equipment for the soldiers in the Roman army. 
 The birth of Adnan, the father of Adnanite Arabs.

 China 
 Emperor Wu of Han appoints Liu Ju, his son by Empress Wei Zifu, as Crown Prince.

Deaths 
 Liu An, Chinese prince, geographer, and cartographer (b. 179 BC)

References